Lior Geller is an Academy Award nominated and Emmy Award nominated Israeli-American film director, screenwriter, producer, editor, cinematographer and composer best known for writing, directing and producing the student short film titled "Roads" which holds the Guinness World Record for Most Awards Won by a Short Student Film and its feature film adaptation "We Die Young" starring Jean-Claude Van Damme.

Early life and education
Geller (born 1982) grew up in Highland Park, New Jersey and Ramat Gan, Israel. He studied film at the Steve Tisch School of Film and Television at Tel Aviv University.

Career
Geller started his film career editing movie trailers and writing, directing and producing several short films, including the multiple award winning short film "Roads" which was nominated for an Academy Award and currently sets the Guinness World Record for Most Awards Won by a Short Student Film.

In 2008, Geller wrote and directed an Emmy nominated documentary which premiered at the 2008 Toronto International Film Festival, won multiple awards, was sold to PBS in the United States where it played on its Wide Angle series in 2009, earning Geller an Emmy nomination.

Following the success of "Roads", Geller was brought to Hollywood where he sold his first feature screenplay "Alone in Damascus" to Eric Eisner’s Double E Pictures. After the sale of "Alone in Damascus", Geller went on to sell multiple screenplays as a screenwriter and direct several unscripted television series.

Geller's feature film debut, "We Die Young", premiered at the 2019 Mammoth Film Festival on February 7, 2019 in Mammoth Lakes, CA as the festival’s opening night gala film. Prior to the screening, the film was preemptively purchased by Lionsgate Films for distribution in the United States. Lionsgate released the film on March 1, 2019 to critical acclaim with particular praise for Geller’s direction and the performance of lead actor Jean-Claude Van Damme. John Delia of Aced Magazine gave the film 4 out of 5 stars calling the film “Shocking, violent and emotional…” stating of director Lior Geller's work, “Geller… sets up the audience for a front row seat on a Godfather resembling movie.” "We Die Young" is based on Geller's Oscar nominated short film and stars Jean-Claude Van Damme, Elijah Rodriguez (Sicario: Day of the Soldado), David Castañeda (The Umbrella Academy, End of Watch, Sicario: Day of the Soldado) and Joana Metrass (Once Upon a Time). Geller is also in development of a television series based on the biblical story of The Maccabees.

Awards and nominations
Since 2007 Geller has received numerous awards and nominations setting a Guinness World Record for Most Awards Won by a Short Student Film for Roads.

Filmography
Lior Geller has a catalogue of films and documentaries he produced, wrote and directed. The table below chronicles his filmography.

References

External links
 

1982 births
Living people
Israeli film directors
Israeli film producers
Israeli female screenwriters
Israeli cinematographers
American film directors
American film producers
American male screenwriters
American cinematographers